The 1912–13 season was Stoke's fourth season in the Southern Football League. In 1913, the club reached its 50th year in existence.

Stoke had ambitions to return to the Football League and the objective for the 1912–13 season was earn a top six place in the Southern League Division One. However Stoke failed spectacularly and ended up finishing bottom and being relegated to the Southern League Division Two. The season was a complete embarrassment to the directors and management and fans started to lose patience with manager Alfred Barker.

Season review

League
With Alfred Barker still manager of the club there were high hopes that the 1912–13 season would see Stoke come good in the top division of the Southern League. The players who had served the club well over the past 12 months or so were all retained and new players were added to the squad to make competition for places harder. The main ambition was a top six place, but by Christmas time Stoke were bottom of the table and stayed there. The directors attributed relegation to bad luck while the supporters blamed Barker. William Smith, who had been such a key player in attack missed most of the season through injury and his absence proved costly as Stoke had a very poor forward line. Only 14 goals were scored in the first 15 matches (4 against Watford) summed up Stoke's problems and there was no upturn in fortune after Christmas and relegation was duly suffered and it was back to the drawing board once more.

By the end of the season the directors came under considerable pressure from supporters as they were reluctant to accept a place back in Division Two and by the end of April 1913 no players had been offered a new contract contrary to previous practice. The directors eventually accepted life in the Southern League Division Two again but fans vented their anger at them in the annual general meeting.

FA Cup
Stoke's miserable season also included a first round exit to fellow Southern League side Reading.

Final league table

Key: P = Matches played; W = Matches won; D = Matches drawn; L = Matches lost; F = Goals for; A = Goals against; GA = Goal average; Pts = Points

Results

Stoke's score comes first

Legend

Southern Football League Division One

FA Cup

Squad statistics

References

Stoke City F.C. seasons
Stoke